Across the Universe is an interstellar radio message (IRM) consisting of the song "Across the Universe" by the Beatles that was transmitted on 4 February 2008, at 00:00 UTC by NASA  in the direction of the star Polaris. This transmission was made using a 70-meter dish in the NASA Deep Space Network's (DSN) Madrid Deep Space Communication Complex, located in Robledo, near Madrid, Spain.

This action was done in order to celebrate the 40th anniversary of the song's recording, the 45th anniversary of the DSN, and the 50th anniversary of NASA. The idea was hatched by Beatles historian Martin Lewis, who encouraged all Beatles fans to play the track as it was beamed towards the distant star. The event marked the second time a song had ever been intentionally transmitted into deep space (the first being Russia's Teen Age Message in 2001), and was approved by Paul McCartney, Yoko Ono, and Apple Records.

See also 
 List of interstellar radio messages

References 
 The first musical interstellar radio message (criticism of "NASA Beatles Transmission" at pp. 1111–1112)

Search for extraterrestrial intelligence
Interstellar messages
Time capsules
Technology in society
Musical tributes to the Beatles
2008 in Spain
2008 in science
2008 in music